Blue Demon is a Spanish-language television series produced by Teleset for Televisa and Sony Pictures Television.

A total of 3 seasons aired.

Series overview

Episodes

Season 1 (2016) 
Blim released the first season of Blue Demon on November 11, 2016. In the United States, it premiered on UniMás on January 15, 2017 airing Monday through Friday.

Season 2 (2017) 
Blim released the second season of Blue Demon on February 24, 2017. In the United States, it premiered on UniMás on March 8, 2017 airing Monday through Friday.

Season 3 (2017) 
Blim released the third season of Blue Demon on April 14, 2017. In the United States, it premiered on UniMás on April 6, 2017, however it was still promoted as the second season, and aired Monday through Friday until May 6, 2017 when it was moved to Saturday's

References 

Lists of Mexican drama television series episodes